Peter Torebko (born 10 February 1988) is a German tennis player. He competes mainly on the ATP Challenger Tour and ITF Men's Circuit. On 16 July 2012, he reached his highest ATP singles ranking of world No. 182.

Torebko made his ATP World Tour debut at the 2011 Romanian Open, losing to Igor Andreev in the first round.

Singles performance timeline

References

External links

1988 births
Living people
German male tennis players